Jan Stanisław Sztolcman (sometimes referred to as Jean Stanislaus Stolzmann) (19 November 1854, Warsaw – 28 April 1928, Warsaw) was a Polish ornithologist.

Biography
Beginning in 1872, Sztolcman studied zoology at the Imperial University of Warsaw. From 1875 to 1882, he collected zoological specimens in South America, primarily in Peru, and from 1882 to 1884, he lived and worked in Ecuador. He collected several hundred species of birds from South America, with some of the specimens being little known or entirely unknown to European ornithologists. In 1884, he returned to Warsaw, where in 1887 he was appointed director of the Branickich zoological museum.

Eponyms
Taxa with the specific epithet of stolzmanni commemorate his name. For example, two species of lizard are named in his honor: Liolaemus stolzmanni and Microlophus stolzmanni.

Written works

Among Sztolcman's written works is a 1926 treatise on the European bison, titled Żubr, jego historia, obyczaje i przyszłość (The wisent, its history, behavior and future). Other significant works by Sztolcman are:
Ornitologia łowiecka (1905) –  Ornithological hunting.
Wspomnienia z podróży (volumes 1, 2); (1912) – Memoirs of the journey.
Szkice ornitologiczne (1916) – Ornithological sketches.

References

External links

1854 births
1928 deaths
Scientists from Warsaw
Polish ornithologists
19th-century Polish zoologists
University of Warsaw alumni
20th-century Polish zoologists